That's My Boy is a British television series which was broadcast in 1963. Produced by ABC Weekend TV, it was broadcast only in the Midlands and Northern England. A half-hour sitcom, the series starred Jimmy Clitheroe. The series survives intact, and the complete series was issued on DVD by Network on 19 May 2014.

References

External links

1963 British television series debuts
1963 British television series endings
1960s British sitcoms
ITV sitcoms
English-language television shows
Black-and-white British television shows
Television series based on radio series
Television shows produced by ABC Weekend TV